Pennsylvania's third congressional district includes several areas of the city of Philadelphia, including West Philadelphia, most of Center City, and parts of North Philadelphia. It has been represented by Democrat Dwight Evans since 2019. With a 2022 Cook Partisan Voting Index of D+39, it is the third most Democratic district in the nation.

Prior to 2018, the district was located in the northwestern part of the state and included the cities of Erie, Sharon, Hermitage, Butler and Meadville. The Supreme Court of Pennsylvania redrew this district in February 2018 after ruling the previous map unconstitutional. The new third district is similar to the old second district and was heavily Democratic for the 2018 election and representation thereafter. Dwight Evans, the incumbent from the old 2nd district, ran for re-election in the new 3rd District.

The current version of the 3rd, like the old 2nd, is a heavily Democratic, black-majority district. In 2020, it gave Joe Biden 91 percent of the vote, his best showing in the nation.

History 
From 1983 to 2003, the district was located in Northeast Pennsylvania and was represented by Rep. Robert Borski; much of that district was merged with the 13th district after the 2000 census, while the 3rd was reconfigured to take in most of the territory in the old 21st district. This version of the 3rd supported President George W. Bush in 2004 as well as John McCain in 2008, Mitt Romney in 2012 and Donald Trump in 2016.

List of members representing the district 

The district was organized from Pennsylvania's At-large congressional district in 1791

1791–1793: One seat

1795–1823: One seat, then three, then two
The district was organized from Pennsylvania's At-large congressional district in 1795. Two additional seats were added in 1803, elected on a general ticket. One of those seats was eliminated in 1813.

1823–present: One seat

The district was reorganized in 1823 to have one seat.

Recent elections

Historical district boundaries

See also
List of United States congressional districts
Pennsylvania's congressional districts

References

 Congressional Biographical Directory of the United States 1774–present

External links
District map
Congressional redistricting in Pennsylvania

03
Constituencies established in 1791
1791 establishments in Pennsylvania
Constituencies disestablished in 1793
1793 disestablishments in Pennsylvania
Constituencies established in 1795
1795 establishments in Pennsylvania